Blum is a town in Hill County, Texas, United States. The population was 444 at the 2010 census.

Geography

Blum is located in northwestern Hill County at  (32.142367, –97.395481), at the junction of Farm to Market Highways 67 and 933.

The Nolan River flows through the northern and western sides of the town, running southwest to the Brazos River in Lake Whitney.

Demographics

As of the census of 2000, there were 399 people, 147 households, and 110 families residing in the town. The population density was 395.8 people per square mile (152.5/km2). There were 177 housing units at an average density of 175.6 per square mile (67.7/km2). The racial makeup of the town was 92.73% White, 0.50% African American, 0.50% Native American, 3.51% from other races, and 2.76% from two or more races. Hispanic or Latino of any race were 8.52% of the population.

There were 147 households, out of which 40.8% had children under the age of 18 living with them, 60.5% were married couples living together, 8.8% had a female householder with no husband present, and 24.5% were non-families. 22.4% of all households were made up of individuals, and 10.9% had someone living alone who was 65 years of age or older. The average household size was 2.71 and the average family size was 3.17.

In the town, the population was spread out, with 32.8% under the age of 18, 7.3% from 18 to 24, 26.8% from 25 to 44, 20.1% from 45 to 64, and 13.0% who were 65 years of age or older. The median age was 31 years. For every 100 females, there were 102.5 males. For every 100 females age 18 and over, there were 92.8 males.

The median income for a household in the town was $31,094, and the median income for a family was $40,521. Males had a median income of $30,250 versus $22,708 for females. The per capita income for the town was $11,459. About 13.9% of families and 15.9% of the population were below the poverty line, including 19.3% of those under age 18 and 16.7% of those age 65 or over.

Education
The town is served by the Blum Independent School District.

Notable people

 Jim Joseph Carmichall, former member of the Texas House of Representatives

References

Towns in Hill County, Texas
Towns in Texas